Mahmoud Farshchian (born 24 January 1930) is an Iranian painter and educator. He was a master of Persian miniature painting.

His paintings have been hosted by several museums and exhibitions worldwide.

Early life and education 
Mahmoud Farshchian was born on January 24, 1930, in the city of Isfahan, Pahlavi Iran. His father, a rug merchant. Young Mahmoud showed an interest in arts quite early in life and studied under the tutelage of Haji Mirza-Agha Emami and Isa Bahadori for several years. 

After receiving his diploma from Isfahan's High School for the Fine Arts, Farshchian left for Europe, where he studied the works of the great western masters of painting. He has a doctorate (grade 1 in arts) in Iranian painting and Islamic arts from the High Council of Culture and Art.

Career 
Upon his return to Iran, he began to work at the National Institute of Fine Arts (which later became the Ministry of Art and Culture) and, in time, was appointed director of the Department of National Arts and professor at the university of Tehran's School of Fine Arts.

In the 1950s, he taught at Jalil Ziapour's School of Decorative Arts for Boys in Tehran. One of his students was painter Faramarz Pilaram. 

Farshchian has been exhibited in 57 individual shows and 86 group shows in Iran, Europe, America and Asian countries. His works are represented in several museums and major collections worldwide. He has been awarded more than ten prizes by various art institutes and cultural centers. 

"The Museum of Master Mahmoud Farshchian", is a museum devoted to the works of the master, which has been set up by the Cultural Heritage Foundation in the Sa'dabad Cultural Complex in Tehran, inaugurated in 2001.

The design of the Zarih (the box-like latticed enclosure which is placed on top of the tomb), roof, door and cellar in the shrine of the 8th shiite Imam, Ali ibn Mus'ar-Reza in Mashhad and his membership in the committee supervising the construction of the shrine, is another artistic work of the master.

Farshchian resides in New Jersey. His son Alimorad Farshchian is a doctor.

Style and aesthetic 

 Master Farshchian Museum Saadabad Palace، Tehran

Farshchian is the founder of his own school in Iranian Painting, which adheres to classical form while making use of new techniques to broaden the scope of Iranian painting. He has brought new life to this art form and has freed it from the symbiotic relationship it has historically had with poetry and literature, to give it an independence it had not previously enjoyed. His powerful and innovative paintings are dynamic, expansive and vibrant canvases with an appealing fusion of the traditional and the modern, which are constituents of his unique style of painting.

Master Farshchian has played a decisive role in introducing Iranian art to the international art scene. He has been invited to speak and exhibit at numerous universities and art institutes. There have been six books and countless articles published about Farshchian's works. In 2007 British-Omani designer Amr Ali used Farschian's painting The Fifth Day of Creation as the main influence for his collection presented at London Fashion Week.

Books 
 Painting and drawing (1976)
 Master Farshchian's paintings in Shahnameh of Ferdowsi  (1991)
 Painting of the great heroes of Shahnameh (1991)
 Mahmoud Farshchian Volume II Selected By UNESCO (1991)
 Master Farshchian's paintings in Divan of Hafez (2002)
 Master Farshchian's paintings in Rubaiyat of Omar Khayyam (2004)
 Mahmoud Farshchian Volume III Selected By UNESCO (2004)

Awards
2011 - DeviantART, Daily Deviation for Apr 6.
2010 - DeviantART, Daily Deviation for Jun 26.
2010 - DeviantART, Daily Deviation for Mar 27.
2009 - DeviantART, Daily Deviation for Dec 13. 
2001 - GODIVA Chocolates 75th Anniversary, USA
2001 - Who's Who in the 21st Century, Cambridge, England
2000 - Outstanding intellectuals of the 21st Century, Cambridge, England
1995 - Gold Medal, Highest Honor
1987 - Golden Palm of Europe
1985 - Oscar D'Italia, gold statuette.
1984 - Vessillo Europa Delle Arte, gold statuette. Italy
1983 - Diploma Accadenu'co D'Europa, L’Accademia D'Europa. Italy
1983 - Diploma Maestro Di Pittura, II Seminario d'Arte Moderna. Italy
1982 - Diploma Di Merito, Universita Delle Arti. Italy
1980 - Academia Italia delle Arti e del Lavoro, gold medal.
1973 - Ministry of Culture and Art, 1st prize in art. Iran
1958 - International Art Festival, gold medal. Belgium
1952 - Military Art, gold medal. Iran

References

External links
 Farshchian World
 Mahmoud Farshchian Art
 Farshchian's Art Books
 Farshchian on DeviantART

Artists from Isfahan
Academic staff of the University of Tehran
1930 births
Living people
Iranian still life painters
Recipients of the Order of Culture and Art
Iranian Science and Culture Hall of Fame recipients in Visual Arts